Los Telares is a municipality and village in Santiago del Estero Province in Argentina.

References

Populated places in Santiago del Estero Province